Richard Price (1773 – 10 April 1861) was a Tory politician from Wales. He was the Member of Parliament (MP) for Radnor from 1799 to 1847.

Price was the eldest son Richard Price, a lawyer of Norton Manor, Knighton whose brother was Chase Price, the MP for Radnorshire.  He was educated at University College, Oxford.

The Radnor seat was under the patronage of the 5th Earl of Oxford, whose uncle secured the seat for Price when a vacancy arose in 1799. Price developed his own support base, and within ten years was opposing Oxford's interests in Radnor.

He was a largely silent MP, supporting Tory administrations, and by 1832 had spoken in the House of Commons only to oppose parliamentary reform.

He died 10 April 1861, aged 88.

References

External links 
 

1773 births
1861 deaths
People from Radnorshire
Alumni of University College, Oxford
Tory MPs (pre-1834)
Conservative Party (UK) MPs for Welsh constituencies
Members of the Parliament of Great Britain for Welsh constituencies
British MPs 1796–1800
UK MPs 1801–1802
UK MPs 1802–1806
UK MPs 1806–1807
UK MPs 1807–1812
UK MPs 1812–1818
UK MPs 1818–1820
UK MPs 1820–1826
UK MPs 1826–1830
UK MPs 1830–1831
UK MPs 1831–1832
UK MPs 1832–1835
UK MPs 1835–1837
UK MPs 1837–1841
UK MPs 1841–1847